The name Wilda has been used for ten tropical cyclones in the northwest Pacific Ocean.

Typhoon Wilda (1955) (T5503)
Tropical Depression Wilda (1959) (T5904)
Tropical Storm Wilda (1961) (T6125, 58W)
Typhoon Wilda (1964) (T6420, 32W) – struck southern Japan (ja) .
Tropical Storm Wilda (1967) (T6705,  05W)
Typhoon Wilda (1970) (T7009, 10W, Iliang) – struck southern Japan (ja).
Tropical Storm Wilda (1973) (T7301, 01W, Atring)
Tropical Storm Wilda (1976) (T7611, 11W)
Tropical Storm Wilda (1991) (T9127, 29W)
Typhoon Wilda (1994) (T9432, 35W)

Pacific typhoon set index articles